Alexander Turner (born 10 April 1993) is an American judoka.

He is the bronze medallist of the 2017 Judo Grand Prix Cancún in the -73 kg category.

References

External links
 

1993 births
Living people
American male judoka
20th-century American people
21st-century American people